Red Rooster Records is the record label founded by the band NRBQ in 1972 after being dropped by Columbia Records after lack of chart performance for their albums NRBQ and Boppin' the Blues. It was distributed by Rounder Records from 1972 to 1989, when the band signed on Virgin Records for their album Wild Weekend. The label folded into Rounder in 1990. This was the label that NRBQ would go back to when they had an unsuccessful major label era, like the Mercury Records era (1976) and the Bearsville Records era (1983). The label also released The Shaggs' recordings during the late 1970s to late 80s.

See also
 List of record labels

References 

Record labels established in 1972
Record labels disestablished in 1990
Vanity record labels
Rock record labels
Defunct record labels of the United States